Farid Melgani is an engineer at the University of Trento, Italy. He was named a Fellow of the Institute of Electrical and Electronics Engineers (IEEE) in 2016 for his contributions to image analysis in remote sensing.

References

Fellow Members of the IEEE
Living people
Italian engineers
Year of birth missing (living people)
Place of birth missing (living people)